The Blue Neighbourhood Tour is the second concert tour by Australian recording artist Troye Sivan, in support of his debut studio album Blue Neighbourhood (2015).

Background
On 23 November 2015, two weeks before the release of Sivan's debut album, Blue Neighbourhood (2015), the tour was announced by Sivan while he was in Paris on his debut tour Troye Sivan Live. Shows in North America were announced, while tour dates in Europe were added two weeks later. In December 2015, it was announced that Allie X, LANY and Shamir would serve as supporting opening acts for select dates on the North American leg of the tour.

Set list 
This set list is representative of the show on 3 February 2016, in Vancouver. It does not represent all dates throughout the tour.

 "Bite"
 "for him."
 "Fools"
 "Heaven"
 "Suburbia"
 "Cool"
 "Too Good"
 "Wild"
 "Love Yourself"
 "Happy Little Pill"
 "Ease"
 "DKLA"
 "Talk Me Down"
 "Lost Boy"
 "Youth"

Tour dates

Festivals and other miscellaneous performances
Summer Bash
BLI Summer Jam
KRZ Summer Smash
Trendfest
98 PXY Summer Jam
Kiss Concert
Kiss the Summer Hello
SSIK Show
HOT 107.9 Summer Jam
99.5 WZPL Birthday Bash
AMP Live
Jisan Valley Rock Festival
Fuji Rock Festival
V Festival
iHeartRadio Music Festival

Cancellations and rescheduled shows

References

External links
Troye Sivan official website

2016 concert tours
Troye Sivan concert tours